Mohsen Rais  (1896–1975), also known as Mirza Mohsen Khan, was an Iranian diplomat and served as foreign minister and as ambassador during the Pahlavi era.

Early life and education
Rais was born in 1896 in Tehran. His father was Zahir ol Mulk. He was a graduate of the University of Geneva.

Career
Rais joined the Iranian foreign ministry in 1919. He was part of an association, Gamiyet-i Iran-i Qavan (Young Iran Association), which was founded by Iranian intellectuals in 1921. The founders of the association were all educated in Europe. Rais served as a counsellor in Paris from 1930 to 1933. He was named director of the League of Nations and treaty department in the ministry in 1933 and was in office until 1935. He was the ambassador of Iran to Germany from 1935 to 1938. In 1938, he served as acting foreign minister. He was appointed director general of the political affairs at the foreign ministry in 1938 which he held until 1939.

Then he served as the ambassador to Romania and Yugoslavia (1939-1941), ambassador to France (1941-1942), minister of posts and telecommunications (1942) and ambassador to Iraq (1943-1947). He was appointed Iran's ambassador to the United Kingdom on 6 August 1947, replacing Hassan Taqizadeh in the post. He held the post until July 1950 and was succeeded by Ali Soheili in the post. 

Rais was appointed foreign minister on 18 July 1950 replacing Mahmud Salahi who had been serving as the acting foreign minister since 26 June in the cabinet of Haj Ali Razmara. Rais's term lasted until 11 March 1951 when a new cabinet was formed by Hossein Ala' due to the assassination of Razmara on 7 March. 

In the period 10 November 1953 to 29 January 1958 Rais was the ambassador of Iran to France. From 1958 to 1960, he was the governor-general of Azerbaijan. He was again transferred to diplomatic post and served as ambassador to France (1962-1963), to the Netherlands (1960-1961) and the Court of St. James’s (1961-1962). His last public office was the governor of Tehran (1964-1969) and during the same period he was also a senator.

Personal life and death
Rais was married to one of the daughters of Abdol-Hossein Farman Farma. They had a son and a daughter. His son was killed in a road accident after his graduation from a university. Following this incident Rais was hospitalized and died in 1975.

Honors and awards
Rais was the recipient of various awards, including the Order of Homayun  (1947; 1st class) and 
  Grand Officer of Legion of Honour (1947).

References

20th-century Iranian diplomats
1896 births
Ambassadors of Iran to Germany
Ambassadors of Iran to the United Kingdom
Ambassadors of Iran to the Netherlands
Ambassadors of Iran to Iraq
Ambassadors of Iran to France
Ambassadors of Iran to Romania
Ambassadors of Iran to Yugoslavia
Foreign ministers of Iran
Government ministers of Iran
Iranian governors
Politicians from Tehran
People of Pahlavi Iran
Recipients of the Legion of Honour
Date of death unknown
University of Geneva alumni